The Chloropagus Formation is a geologic formation in Nevada. It preserves fossils dating back to the Neogene period.

See also

 List of fossiliferous stratigraphic units in Nevada
 Paleontology in Nevada

References
 

Neogene geology of Nevada
Neogene California